Armenia competed at the 2016 Winter Youth Olympics in Lillehammer, Norway from 12 to 21 February 2016.

Cross-country skiing

Boys

Figure skating

Singles

See also
Armenia at the 2016 Summer Olympics

2016 in Armenian sport
Nations at the 2016 Winter Youth Olympics
Armenia at the Youth Olympics